Nina Gantz is a Dutch animation film director.
Gantz is a daughter of the Dutch actress Loes Luca. In 2010 she graduated at the Akademie voor Kunst en Vormgeving St. Joost in Breda with the short animation film Zaliger which won a Golden Panda at the Sichuan TV Festival in Sichuan. In 2015 she graduated at the National Film and Television School in Beaconsfield with Edmond, a stop motion film with puppets. The film won amongst others the prize for best short animation film at the Sundance Film Festival and a BAFTA Award.

Filmography 
 Zaliger (2010)
 Edmond (2015)

References

External links 
  Nederlandse regisseur Nina Gantz wint Britse filmprijs, NOS Nieuws
 Dutch short animated film wins top British award, DutchNews

1987 births
Living people
Dutch animators
Dutch film directors
Dutch animated film directors
Dutch women animators
Artists from Amsterdam